Chicago, Rock Island and Pacific Railroad Depot may refer to:

Any of numerous train stations of the Chicago, Rock Island and Pacific Railroad

These include 

Chicago, Rock Island, and Pacific Railroad Depot (Blue Mountain, Arkansas), listed on the NRHP in Arkansas
Chicago, Rock Island and Pacific Railroad Depot (Marseilles, Illinois), listed on the NRHP in Illinois
Chicago, Rock Island & Pacific Railroad Depot (Atlantic, Iowa), listed on the NRHP in Iowa
Chicago, Rock Island & Pacific Railroad Passenger Depot (Council Bluffs, Iowa), listed on the NRHP in Iowa
Chicago, Rock Island & Pacific Railroad Depot (Des Moines, Iowa), NRHP-eligible
Chicago, Rock Island and Pacific Railroad-Grinnell Passenger Station, listed on the NRHP in Iowa
Chicago, Rock Island & Pacific Railroad Depot (Iowa City, Iowa), listed on the NRHP in Iowa
Chicago, Rock Island and Pacific Passenger Depot-Pella, Pella, IA, listed on the NRHP in Iowa
Chicago, Rock Island and Pacific Railroad: Stuart Passenger Station, Stuart, IA, listed on the NRHP in Iowa
Chicago, Rock Island and Pacific Railroad-Wilton Depot, Wilton, Iowa, listed on the NRHP in Iowa

See also
Rock Island Depot (disambiguation)
Chicago, Rock Island and Pacific Railroad Stone Arch Viaduct, Shelby, IA, listed on the NRHP in Iowa